George Washington Aldridge Sr. (November 3, 1833 – December 8, 1877) was a New York politician. He was the Mayor of Rochester, New York from 1873 to 1874. He is buried in Rochester's Mount Hope Cemetery.

References

1833 births
1877 deaths
Mayors of Rochester, New York
Burials at Mount Hope Cemetery (Rochester)
19th-century American politicians